Mirsha Serrano Pérez (May 2, 1979 – July 23, 2007) was a Mexican football player with Tecos UAG. He died in a car accident on July 23, 2007.

Club career
Born in Acapulco, Serrano made 139 Primera División appearances, scoring five goals, during a 15-season career. He played thirteen seasons with Tecos UAG and two with Atlante. Serrano made his debut in the Primera División de México with Tecos UAG on February 20, 2000.

References

External links
 

1979 births
2007 deaths
Atlante F.C. footballers
Tecos F.C. footballers
Association football midfielders
Sportspeople from Acapulco
Footballers from Guerrero
Road incident deaths in Mexico
Mexican footballers